Joe Heap (born 1986) is an English author who resides in London. His poetry has been published in several journals and he was a winner of the 2004 Foyle Young Poet Award. He was a guest author at the 2018 Edinburgh International Book Festival.

Life and works 
Heap was born in London and grew up in Bradford, West Yorkshire. He later moved to Scotland where he completed a Masters in Creative Writing at the University of Glasgow. Heap’s first book, The Rules of Seeing (HarperCollins, 2018), was shortlisted for the Books Are My Bag Breakthrough Author award and won the RNA’s Debut Romantic Novel award in 2018. His second novel was When The Music Stops (HarperCollins, 2020).

References 

1986 births
21st-century English poets
Writers from Bradford
Alumni of the University of Glasgow
Living people